Portlaoise railway station is a station on the Dublin to Cork and also the Dublin to Limerick Intercity railway lines.
It is also the terminus for the South Western Commuter also called the Portlaoise Commuter Line which forms part of the Dublin Suburban Rail network in the commuter belt for Dublin. It is the busiest county town railway station in the midlands region with up to 32 trains to Dublin (10 Non-Stop) and 30 trains from Dublin (9 Non-Stop) per day.

It is situated in Portlaoise town centre, in County Laois.

History

Portlaoise (formerly Maryborough) railway station opened on 26 June 1847. It was designed by Sancton Wood.

In March 2008, Irish Rail opened a new Traincare depot south-west of Portlaoise town centre (officially opened on 25 July 2008).
The depot provides a high quality maintenance and servicing facility for the 183 intercity railcars and some facilities for outer suburban railcars serving the Dublin - Portlaoise route. Irish Rail also have their Permanent Way depot South of the station.

Bus links
M & A Coaches routes 828 and 828X serve the station providing links to locations such as Cashel, Urlingford, Durrow and Abbeyleix and in the other direction to the Midland Regional Hospital, Portlaoise. The bus stop is located just outside the station building on Station Road (accessed via stairs from Platform 1).

See also
 List of railway stations in Ireland

References

External links

Irish Rail Portlaoise Station website

Buildings and structures in Portlaoise
Iarnród Éireann stations in County Laois
Railway stations in County Laois
1847 establishments in Ireland
Railway stations opened in 1847
Railway stations in the Republic of Ireland opened in 1847